This is a list of yearly Michigan Intercollegiate Athletic Association football standings.

MIAA standings

References

Michigan Intercollegiate Athletic Association
Standings
Michigan Intercollegiate Athletic Association football standings